Marc Zender is an anthropologist, epigrapher, and linguist noted for his work on Maya hieroglyphic writing. He is Associate Professor in the Department of Anthropology at Tulane University and a research affiliate at the Middle American Research Institute. His research interests include anthropological and historical linguistics, comparative writing systems, and archaeological decipherment, with a regional focus on Mesoamerica (particularly Mayan, Ch'orti', and Nahuatl/Aztec). He is the author of several books and dozens of articles touching on these themes.

Education 
Zender obtained a BA in anthropology from the University of British Columbia in 1997, and his MA (1999) and PhD (2004) from the University of Calgary. His dissertation was entitled A Study on Classic Maya Priesthood.

Lecture series
Marc Zender  presents a 24 lecture series entitled "Writing and Civilization: Ancient Worlds to Modernity" where he covers the   anthropologic history of language reduced to writing. This The Great Courses college level course traces the origin and development of writing.

Distinctions  
 Peabody Museum Research Grant, Peabody Museum, Harvard University, 2010–2011
 Certificate of Distinction for Excellence in Teaching, Harvard University, 2007, 2008, 2009, 2010 
Ralph Steinhauer Award of Distinction, Alberta Heritage Scholarship Fund, 2002

Publications  
 1999 Diacritical Marks and Underspelling in the Classic Maya Script : Implications for Decipherment. M.A. Thesis, Department of Archaeology, University of Calgary.

 2004 On the Morphology of Intimate Possession in Mayan Languages and Classic Mayan Glyphic Nouns. In The Linguistics of Maya Writing (édited by Søren Wichmann, University of Utah Press, Salt Lake City).

References

External links
 (en) AIA Online Interactive Dig , Cahal Pech, Belize (2014-2015)
 (en) Joseph Schuldenrein, 'Deciphering Archaeology: Mayan Hieroglyphs', Myth, Reality, and 21st Century Archaeology (Dec 11, 2013)
 (en) Andrea Cooper, 'The One Who Hammers,' Trek Magazine, number 34, pp. 18–21 (Dec 2013)
 (en) Krystal D'Costa, 'Modern Lessons from a Lost Language,' Scientific American (Feb 28, 2013)
 (en) Julie Murphy, ‘Maya archeology event in Flagler largest in 7 years,’ The Daytona Beach News-Journal (Sept 30, 2013)
 (en) Thomas Dodson, 'The Origins and Development of Writing', CNC Web Interview (Dec 4, 2010)
 (en) Corydon Ireland, 'Language Made Visible,' Harvard Gazette Online, Monday (Sept 20, 2010)
 (en) 'Lost Language Found on the Back of 400-Year-Old Letter', National Geographic News (Aug 29, 2010)

Year of birth missing (living people)
Living people
Harvard University faculty
American anthropologists
Tulane University faculty